Dahimi-ye Do (also Romanized as Daḩīmī-ye Do; also known as Dahīmeh-ye Do) is a village in Ahudasht Rural District, Shavur District, Shush County, Khuzestan Province, Iran. At the 2006 census, its population was 1,154, in 148 families.

References 

Populated places in Shush County